The End of Innocence is a 1990 semi-autobiographical film starring, written and directed by Dyan Cannon. It was produced by Leonard Rabinowitz and Stanley Fimberg.

Plot
Unwanted and ignored by her eternally squabbling parents, a young girl is spiritually torn apart by forces beyond her control. Her parents do further damage to her battered psyche by giving her mixed messages concerning sex and religion. However, her self-esteem dwindles to microscopic proportions on account of a series of worthless boyfriends. After suffering a nervous breakdown, she is placed in an asylum, where she is treated for the first time as a human being rather than a nuisance by a compassionate psychiatrist.

Cast
 Dyan Cannon as Stephanie
 Alison Sweeney as Stephanie (12–15 years old)
 Rebecca Schaeffer as Stephanie (18–25 years old)
 John Heard as Dean
 Billie Bird as Mrs. Yabledablov
 Michael Madsen as Earl
 Todd Field as Richard
 Connie Sawyer as Grandma
 Albert Henderson as Grandpa
 Stephen Meadows as Michael
 Dennis Burkley as Tiny
 Stoney Jackson as Leroy
 Viveka Davis as Honey
 Renee Taylor as Angel
 Madge Sinclair as Nurse Bowlin

Trivia
Rebecca Schaeffer's final theatrical film before her murder on July 18, 1989, and was released posthumously. The End of Innocence marks the film debut of future Days of Our Lives star Alison Sweeney.

References

External links
 
 
 

1990 films
1990 drama films
American drama films
American independent films
Films about drugs
Films scored by Michael Convertino
1990 independent films
1990 directorial debut films
1990s English-language films
1990s American films